Tshukudu Private Game Reserve, is situated next to the Kruger Park, near Hoedspruit, Limpopo province, South Africa. The name "Tshukudu" means "rhino" in Sotho. Tshukudu has been a family owned reserve since 1980.

Wildlife 
Wildlife species include: lion, leopard, South African cheetah, African bush elephant, southern white rhino, common eland, waterbuck, kudu, bushbuck, wildebeest, Burchell's zebra, South African giraffe, warthog, impala, steenbuck, duiker, porcupine, jackal, hyena, caracal, serval, civet, genet, Southern African wildcat, hippo, and Nile crocodile.

See also 
 Protected areas of South Africa

Nature reserves in South Africa